Sandbach (pronounced ) is a historic market town and a civil parish in the unitary authority of Cheshire East, Cheshire, England. The civil parish contains four settlements: Sandbach itself as the largest, Elworth, Ettiley Heath and Wheelock.

Sandbach is perhaps best known as the original home of Foden and ERF lorries, though neither company now exists in the town; twelve-times National Brass Band Championship winners Foden's Band; the ancient Saxon Sandbach Crosses; and Sandbach services on the M6 motorway.

History

Known as Sanbec in 1086, Sondbache (also Sondebache) in 1260, and Sandbitch in the 17th–18th centuries, Sandbach derives its name from the Anglo-Saxon sand bæce, which can mean "sand stream" or "sand valley". The modern German word Bach, with a similar origin as bæce, means "brook"; thus, the meaning of Sandbach can be understood correctly in German. In Germany, there are two places and several small waterways of that name, see German disambiguation page "Sandbach".

Traces of settlement are found in Sandbach from Saxon times, when the town was called Sanbec. Little is known about the town during this period, except that it was subjected to frequent Welsh and Danish raids. The town's inhabitants were converted to Christianity in the 7th century by four priests: Cedda, Adda, Betti and Diuma. The town has an entry in the Domesday Book from 1086, at which time it was sufficiently large to need a priest and a church. The entry states:

Sanbec: Bigot de Loges. 1 hide and 1½ virgates pay tax. Land for 2 ploughs. 1 Frenchman has ½ plough, 3 slaves. 2 villagers have ½ plough. Church. Woodland. Value TRE 4s; now 8s.

By the 13th century, during the reign of King John, much of the land around the township of Sandbach was owned by Richard de Sandbach who was the High Sheriff of Cheshire in 1230. Richard de Sandbach specifically owned a manor; he claimed an interest in the living of Sandbach. This claim against Earl Randle de Blundeville was unsuccessful. His son, John, however, was slightly more successful as he won an 'interest' temporarily against the Abbot of Dieulacres, only for it to be lost when it went to the King's Bench.

The manor in Sandbach passed through numerous families, including the Leghs and Radclyffes. It was eventually bought by Sir Randulph (or Randle) Crewe, who became the Lord of the Manor.

Sandbach has been a market town since 1579, when it was granted a Royal Charter by Elizabeth I due to the petitioning of Sir John Radclyffe of Ordsall who, as the largest landowner in Sandbach and the owner of the Sandbach Old Hall, encouraged the farmers of the area to hold a market in the town on Thursdays. The charter also allowed for right to establish a Court-leet and a Court of Pied-powder. The original charter is still preserved, and can be found in Chester; a reproduction can be found in the Sandbach Town Council chamber, which is at the Literary Institution. The charter also granted the town the right to hold two annual fairs, which lasted for two days, and were held around Easter and early September. The Thursday market is still held outdoors on Scotch Common, and in and around the town hall.

17th century to present day

During the 17th century, the town used to be famous for its ale:

And about 1621 William Webb writes that "Our ale here at Sandbach being no less famous than that [at Derby] of a true nappe".

During the Wars of the Three Kingdoms, a Scottish army swept down into England before being forced to retreat at the Battle of Worcester. On 3 September 1651, the Sandbach summer fair was being held, and a Scottish army of around 1,000 exhausted cavalry men passed through the town under the command of David Leslie on their way back to Scotland. The town proved to be a difficult retreat route, however, as the people of Sandbach and the market stallholders attacked the Scottish army. A newspaper of the time said:
The dispute was very hot for two or three houres, and there were some townsmen hurt and two or three slaine, the Townesman slew about nine or ten and tooke 100 prisoners.

This was the only notable event of the Civil War to have happened in Sandbach. As the fair and the fight took place on the common of the town, after this event the common gained the name Scotch Common.

In 1836 Sandbach silk mills employed 554 people, including 98 boys and girls under 12 years old.
In 1801 the population was 1,844; by 1851 this had reached 4,659. The town centre is shown on an 1840 map. Sandbach became a civil parish in 1866. The records from 1901 show a population of 5,568. The Sandbach Corn Mill was a three-story brick building built in the late 19th century, on what is now Mill Hill Lane.

In 1933 the ERF lorry company was founded. In 1936 parts of the area of Bradwall, all of Elton and Wheelock were added, significantly increasing the size of the parish. The hamlets transferred from Bradwall were Boothlane Head, Brickhouses, Ettiley Heath, Forge Fields, Hindheath, Elworth and Marsh Green. By 1951 the population had reached 9,253.

During Warship Week in December 1941 Sandbach adopted HMS Vimiera as its affiliated ship. The Vimiera was lost on 9 January 1942 when it was sunk by a mine in the Thames Estuary off East Spile Buoy with the loss of 96 hands.

Governance

Sandbach hosts the administrative headquarters for Cheshire East Council. For the Cheshire East unitary authority elections the town is divided into two wards.

From 1875 until 1894 Sandbach was governed by Sandbach Urban Sanitary District. Between 1894 and 1974 the town was governed by Sandbach Urban District Council. In 1974, it was merged with other urban and rural councils to form Congleton Borough Council, which was later dissolved on 31 March 2009. The new authority Cheshire East took over its responsibilities and those of Cheshire County Council on 1 April 2009.

Sandbach Town Council has jurisdiction over the parish of Sandbach, not just the town. All meetings are held in the Town Hall.

For the purposes of the town council and borough council elections Sandbach is divided into four wards: Elworth, Ettiley Heath and Wheelock, Sandbach Heath and East, and Town Ward, and town councillors are elected for terms of four years.

A partnership of groups forms the Sandbach Partnership, which is part of the South East Cheshire Enterprise (SECE).

Constituencies
The town is in the Congleton constituency and the current MP is Fiona Bruce. Before the 2010 General Election the town's MP was Ann Winterton, who served the constituency since 1983. Before its current constituency, Sandbach has been part of five other constituencies: South Cheshire from 1832 to 1867, Mid Cheshire from 1868 to 1885, Crewe from 1885 to 1948, Knutsford from 1949 to 1954 and Crewe from 1955 to 1974.

Geography

As with most of the United Kingdom, Sandbach has an oceanic climate.

{{Weather box
|location = Sandbach
|metric first = Yes
|single line = Yes
|Jan high C = 6
|Feb high C = 6
|Mar high C = 9
|Apr high C = 11
|May high C = 15
|Jun high C = 18
|Jul high C = 19
|Aug high C = 19
|Sep high C = 17
|Oct high C = 13
|Nov high C = 9
|Dec high C = 7
|Jan low C = 1
|Feb low C = 1
|Mar low C = 2
|Apr low C = 4
|May low C = 7
|Jun low C = 10
|Jul low C = 12
|Aug low C = 12
|Sep low C = 10
|Oct low C = 7
|Nov low C = 3
|Dec low C = 2
|source 1 = Monthly averages for Sandbach, United Kingdom The Weather Channel'.' Retrieved 24 October 2010.
|date=August 2010
}}

The land area of Sandbach (including its four settlements) totals about 10.7 square kilometres (4.1 sq mi). The nearest large town is Crewe, which is 6 miles (10 km) to the south-west by road and can be reached either via the A534 Wheelock/Haslington bypass or via Winterley and Haslington. The town is served by the M6 motorway, junction 17 and Sandbach Station on the Crewe to Manchester mainline.

Landmarks
The Sandbach Crosses are an important historical feature on the cobbled market square: the two Saxon crosses, reportedly built in the 7th, 8th or 9th century, constitute a Scheduled Ancient Monument. A plaque near the crosses reads:
Saxon crosses completed in the 9th century to commemorate the advent of Christianity in this Kingdom of Mercia about AD 653 in the reign of the Saxon king Penda. They were restored in 1816 by Sir John Egerton after destruction by iconoclasts.

Sandbach is also home to  many listed buildings, including Sandbach School, St Mary's Church and the Old Hall Hotel. Many of the local public houses, which were formerly stage coach stops, are listed, for example the Lower Chequer. Many of the buildings of the town were designed by the renowned architect Sir George Gilbert Scott; he designed Sandbach Literary Institution, Sandbach School, St John's, Sandbach Heath and the Almshouses. He also restored St Mary's Church. The town has Methodist, Baptist, Anglican and Catholic churches.

Natural England has designated Sandbach Flashes, a group of 14 separate waterbodies,  as a Site of Special Scientific Interest (SSSI), described as:
"a site of physiographical and biological importance. It consists of a series of pools formed as a result of subsidence due to the solution of underlying salt deposits [...] that show considerable variation in their plant and animal communities".
At least 225 species of bird have been recorded on the Flashes.

Economy

Sandbach has been a market town since 1579 when it was granted a Royal Charter by Elizabeth I. Today the Thursday market is still held outdoors on Scotch Common, and in and around Sandbach Town Hall.

Sandbach is probably best known as the original home of both Foden and ERF lorries, both companies founded by members of the Foden family. Neither company now exists in Sandbach, having been taken over and production moved elsewhere. As of 2007 there is no trace of Fodens within Sandbach, with the former mansion home of the Foden family at Westfields being demolished to make way for a new council building. However, Foden's Brass Band, originally created for employees, is still based in Sandbach.

There is also a farmers' market which takes place on the second Saturday of each calendar month. There are a number of shops and bars concentrated in the town centre.

Sandbach is now in large part a dormitory town for the adjacent conurbations of Greater Manchester, Merseyside and the Potteries. A large number of people work at Cheshire East Council, which has its headquarters at Westfields. There is light industry, manufacturing and warehouses at Millbuck Industrial Area.

Transport
The town is served by Sandbach railway station, on the Crewe to Manchester Line, which is located to the west of the town in Elworth. Services are operated by Northern Trains between Crewe, Manchester Piccadilly and Liverpool Lime Street. Trains operate generally twice an hour in both directions; northbound services alternate between trains to Manchester (via Stockport) and to Liverpool (via Styal and Manchester). 

There is a branch line north of the station leading to Northwich, which is mainly used by goods traffic and express passenger trains heading to Chester. Some organisations have been campaigning to restore a local passenger service between Northwich and Crewe. 

Pressure of road traffic going from Greater Manchester to Crewe has forced the building of a bypass for Sandbach, Wheelock, Wheelock Heath, Winterley and Haslington for the A534. This is largely due to the M6 motorway which has a junction (J17) at Sandbach, which is close to the RoadChef service station.

Local bus services are provided by Arriva Midlands and D&G Bus.

Public services

In Sandbach water services are provided by United Utilities. Healthcare is provided at Ashfields Primary Care Centre. The primary care centre is overseen by Central and Eastern Cheshire Primary Care Trust. The nearest local hospital is Leighton Hospital in Crewe. Sandbach is served by the North West Ambulance Service. Policing is provided by Cheshire Constabulary. Cheshire Fire & Rescue Service runs the fire station in the town.

Education

Primary schools

The following primary schools are in Sandbach Town and Civil Parish.
Sandbach Community Primary School
Offley Primary School
Sandbach Heath St John's CE Primary School
Wheelock Primary School
Elworth Church of England Primary School
Elworth Hall Primary School

Secondary schools
Sandbach School was founded as a parish charity school for boys in 1677. The school became a grammar school for boys after 1955. In 1979 the school became an independent comprehensive boys school, with charitable status, funded by Cheshire Local Education Authority but controlled by a board of governors. In September 2011, Sandbach School became a free school, one of the first free schools to be established in England. The school also contains a sixth form which is open to both boys and girls.

Within Sandbach there is also a girls comprehensive school, Sandbach High. It was originally the town's mixed secondary modern when Sandbach School served as the boys' grammar school, but has been a single-sex comprehensive since 1979. It now has a college attached to it, which accepts boys as well as girls and offers a more vocational side of education along with A levels.

Cadets
1873 (Sandbach) Squadron is the local squadron of the Air Training Corps. Founded in 1952, it is part of Staffordshire Wing and the West Midlands Reserve Forces. Cadets here parade twice a week; Wednesdays and Fridays from 19:15 to 21:30. The squadron usually parades about 20–30 cadets per parade night.

24 Sandbach Detachment, Cheshire Army Cadet Force is based in the Army Cadet Centre behind the police station. Meeting every Monday and Thursday evening 19:30 – 21:30 hrs 

Sandbach Fire Station Cadets consists of around 20 young people and meet every Tuesday evening.

The Combined Cadet Force (CCF) is based at Sandbach School.

Culture

Sandbach has an annual transport festival which usually takes place during April. It originally started in 1992 as ‘Transport Through the Ages Parade', and was such a success that it became an annual event; since its inception it has been run alongside the National Town Criers' competition. The Festival is run by an organising committee made up of local councils and volunteers.

Foden's Brass Band is still based in the town, despite the truck manufacturer from which it derives its name no longer having a presence. In 2008 Foden's became British Open Brass Band Champions. The Lions Youth Brass Band and Roberts Bakery Band are also based in the town.

Sandbach Voices is a local choir that was founded in 1947 and is a registered charity. The choir's mission is to bring choral music into the community, and it regularly stages concerts, often in Sandbach Town Hall or at St Mary's Church.

Sandbach Concert Series features classical, jazz and brass music."Sandbach Concert Series is a Winner", Local Life magazine, 2011 (ref )

At the end of November every year the Christmas lights are turned on by the chairman of the town council.

Media

Local newspapers distributed in Sandbach include The Chronicle (Sandbach & Middlewich edition), published on Wednesdays (and now incorporated into the Crewe Chronicle);  the Chronicle Series paper Sandbach Chronicle, published on Thursdays; Crewe Guardian on Thursdays; the South Cheshire Advertiser; and the daily Sentinel (Cheshire edition). The Saxon is a free 8-page bimonthly delivered to 7,000 homes, and the Sandbach & District Talking Newspaper'' is a weekly local talking newspaper aimed at assisting the visually impaired, with over 1000 issues since the first in December 1986.

South Cheshire is served by BBC Radio Stoke. It is also in the broadcast area of Cheshire FM, Macclesfield based Silk FM and Stoke-on-Trent-based Signal 1 and Greatest Hits Radio Staffordshire & Cheshire.

Sport

The local football club is Sandbach United, an "FA Charter Standard Community Club" which has over 40 teams and 600 players aged from 5 through to veteran. The club was founded in 2004 when Sandbach Albion and Sandbach Ramblers merged. In 2009 it completed work with the borough council in developing its new sports facility.  The first team turned semi-professional and were promoted to the North West Counties League within the English non-league football pyramid at step 6 in 2016, reaching the league cup final and a play-off position in their first season. Other local teams include Sandbach Curshaws and  Sandbach Town, who play in the Crewe & District Football League.

The local rugby union club is Sandbach RUFC. The club is the largest sports club in the area. Sandbach 1st XV play in the RFU National 3 Midlands; many levels higher than other local rivals. Currently at Level 5, they are one of the few truly amateur clubs in the RFU National League structure.  Many old boys have gone on to play Premiership and International Rugby. Sandbach Rugby Club offers playing opportunities for both sexes of all ages. Every Tuesday evening at 7.00pm the club offers Social Touch (a non-contact game) to all adults. Touch rugby is open to the public and is free of charge.

The local cricket club is Sandbach Cricket Club.  In 2008 the First XI won the Cheshire Cricket Alliance League – Division 1 on the last day of the season to gain promotion to the Meller Braggins League – Division 3.  Another local side is Elworth Cricket Club which plays in the North Staffs & South Cheshire Cricket League – Championship Division 1. The Club operates 5 senior teams, a midweek team and 9 junior teams at U9, U11, U13, U15 and U17 levels. Sandbach Squash Club enters two teams in the North West Counties League.

There are two golf clubs in Sandbach. Sandbach Golf Club is located on Middlewich Road, approximately ½ a mile west of the town centre. It was founded in 1895 and is a challenging 9-hole parkland course (with 16 tees) welcoming both members and visitors during the week and at weekends. Malkins Bank Golf Course is an 18-hole course formerly operated by Cheshire East Council. Sandbach also has a thriving darts league – with both men's and ladies' leagues playing in most of the many pubs in the area.

Sandbach Leisure Centre is on Middlewich Road and is run by Cheshire East Council. Sandbach School offers community sports facilities.

Notable people

 John M. Allegro (1923–1988), an English archaeologist and Dead Sea Scrolls scholar, lived and died in Sandbach
 Sir John Barlow, 1st Baronet (1857–1932), Liberal Party politician.
 Alfred Barratt (1844–1881), philosophical writer, went to school in Sandbach.
 Derek Macintosh "Blaster" Bates  (1923–2006), demolition expert.
 Karl Beattie (born 1963), an English television director, producer and cameraman who lives in Sandbach
 John Brereton, 4th Baron Brereton (1659–1718), an English baron in the Peerage of Ireland, lived at Brereton Hall
 Denise Coates CBE (born 1967), an English billionaire businesswoman, the founder and joint chief executive of Bet365, lives in Betchton
 David Eastwood (b. 1959), Vice-Chancellor of the University of Birmingham, was educated at Sandbach School.
 Yvette Fielding (b. 1968), TV presenter, lives near Sandbach.
 Edwin Foden (1841–1911), vehicle manufacturer.
 Neil and Rob Gibbons, (b. 1976 or 77), screenwriters
 Sir George Ernest Haynes (1902–1983), director of the National Council of Social Service, was educated at Sandbach School.
 Samuel Henshall (1764/65–1807), philologist, was baptised in Sandbach.
 The Rt Revd William James (1542 in Sandbach – 1617), an English academic and bishop
 Charles Latham MRCS LSA (1816–1907), physician, recognised by public memorial statue.
 George William Latham (1827–1886), English landowner and barrister.
 John Latham (1761–1843), physician, bought an estate in Sandbach.
 John Latham (1787–1853), magistrate and poet, is buried at Sandbach.
 Peter Mere Latham (1789–1875), physician, son of John Latham (1761–1843), was educated at Sandbach School.
 Sir Charles Lidbury (1880–1978), president Institute of Bankers (1939–46), worked in Sandbach.
 Fred Mortimer (1880–1953), brass band conductor, Foden's Brass Band.
 Harry Mortimer (1902–1992), brass band conductor, Foden Brass Band musician, Professor of trumpet at RNCM.
 Henry Newcome (1627–1695), clergyman, was ordained as Presbyterian minister in Sandbach.
 Wally Oakes GC (1932–1965), a BR train driver who died from fatal burns after staying in his cab to stop his damaged train, lived at Wheelock Heath
 Anthony Palmer VC (1819 Brereton Green – 1892), an English recipient of the Victoria Cross
 Ivor Armstrong Richards (1893–1979), English literary critic.
 George Roper (1934–2003), comedian, lived in the town at the time of his death.
 William Steele (1610–1680), Lord Chancellor of Ireland, was born in Sandbach.

Sport 
 Matt Beesley (born 1992 in Sandbach) an English rugby union player, currently playing at Northampton Saints
 Philip Dunkley (b. 1951), English cricketer.
 Thomas Hilditch (1885 in Sandbach – 1957), an English first-class cricketer
 Charles Kelly (1894–1969), footballer for Tranmere Rovers and Stoke.
 Frank Roberts (1893–1961), Manchester City footballer.
 Bert Sproston (1914–2000), former England footballer, was signed by Leeds United from Sandbach Ramblers.
 Barrie Wheatley, former English footballer, played for Sandbach Ramblers, Liverpool, Crewe Alexandra, and Rochdale

See also

Listed buildings in Sandbach

References

Bibliography

Cheshire Historic Towns Survey: Sandbach Archaeological Assessment, 2003, Cheshire County Council
Cheshire Historic Towns Survey: Sandbach Archaeological Strategy , 2003, Cheshire County Council

External links

 Sandbach Town Council 
 Sandbach  – Ancient Market Town
 Cheshire Market Towns
 Sandbach United Football Club
 Sandbach United Community Football Centre
 Sandbach Community Hub
 Sandbach Town Guide at Sandbach Town Council
 "Sandbach" Pigot & Co.'s Directory of Cheshire (1828–29)
 "Sandbach" Kelly's Directory of Cheshire, 1902
 Portable Antiquities Scheme Database: Sandbach
 Sandbach in Welsh Newspapers online

 
Market towns in Cheshire
Civil parishes in Cheshire
Towns in Cheshire